The 1913 United Kingdom tornado outbreak was an outbreak of Tornadoes, particularly over England and Wales, on 27 October 1913. The most notable tornadoes occurred in South Wales, where at least two tornadoes had winds of at least . This is equal to an F3 on the Fujita scale. One of the tornadoes, at Edwardsville, Merthyr Tydfil, resulted in 6 deaths and hundreds of injuries. This is the deadliest-known tornado to occur in the United Kingdom. Other notable tornadoes struck in Cheshire and Shropshire.

Meteorological background 

A rapidly deepening low-pressure extratropical cyclone tracked quickly south on the afternoon of 27 October. The low pressure helped to sustain a stream of strong southerly winds, as in days previous, sustaining significantly warmer than average conditions. Active weather fronts arriving from the Atlantic Ocean resulted in the instability needed to cause such tornadoes. The low pressure brought cooler air to the country by the 31st.

Tornadoes

Most intense tornadoes

Other tornadoes 
Other tornadoes were reported in England at Blackpool, Craypole, Peckforton, Oundle, Exeter, Collumpton and Worthing. The final tornado of the outbreak was reported at Witcombe Park, Gloucester at around 17:20 on 28 October. A tornado was reported in Scotland at Crathes and in Ireland at Crosshaven. However, all of these tornadoes were generally weak.

See also 
 List of European tornadoes and tornado outbreaks
 1981 United Kingdom tornado outbreak
 1091 London tornado
 1761 Great Malvern tornado
 2005 Birmingham tornado
 2006 London tornado

References 

Tornadoes in the United Kingdom
Tornadoes of 1913
1913 in England
1913 in Wales
Weather events in England